Trevis Smith (born September 8, 1976) is a former football linebacker who played seven years with the Saskatchewan Roughriders of the Canadian Football League. Born in Montgomery, Alabama, Smith was formerly a linebacker for the University of Alabama.

On October 28, 2005, he was charged with aggravated sexual assault in Surrey, BC for knowingly exposing women to the HIV virus by having unprotected sex with them and not revealing his condition. Constable Marc Searle of the RCMP named a complainant called simply "A. O." who claimed that Smith had assaulted her between November 26, 2003, and May 18, 2005. After appearing in court in Surrey, he was freed on a C$10,000 bail after pleading "not guilty".  On November 18, Smith was charged with the same offence in Regina, Saskatchewan after another woman came forward alleging that Smith did not tell her that he was HIV positive before they had unprotected sex.

Smith was found guilty of two counts of aggravated sexual assault—one for each woman—and bail violations on February 8, 2007, and sentenced to 5 years in jail on February 26, 2007; he unsuccessfully appealed the conviction.

He was released from prison on February 25, 2009, and was deported to the United States. On August 18, 2012, it was reported that Smith was dismissed from his position as a high school football coach in Birmingham, Alabama, after the George Washington Carver High School learned of his conviction for aggravated sexual assault.

See also 
 Johnson Aziga
 R. v. Cuerrier

References

External links
 
 
 Ex-CFL player Trevis Smith gets 5½ years in jail for exposing 2 women to HIV
 Delay in Smith Sentencing
 Smith appeals sexual assault conviction
 Ex-girlfriend accused of helping Trevis Smith break bail

1976 births
Living people
African-American players of Canadian football
Canadian football linebackers
People with HIV/AIDS
Sportspeople from Montgomery, Alabama
Players of American football from Montgomery, Alabama
Saskatchewan Roughriders players
Alabama Crimson Tide football players
HIV/AIDS in Canada
Criminal transmission of HIV
21st-century African-American sportspeople
20th-century African-American sportspeople